Athens Senior High School (also referred to as Athens High School, AHS, and Athens Community High School) is a public school located in Athens, Illinois.  It is part of Community Unit School District 213 and includes 317 students in grades 9-12.

The Athens Senior High School mascot is the Warrior and school colors are kelly green and white.  Contrary to popular belief, black is not an official school color.

Location 
Athens Senior High School is located in Menard county at 1 Warrior Way, Athens, IL 62613.

Demographics

School song 
We'll pull, pull for you team. We’re ever loyal to you.
So let's win boys let's win, to tradition let's be true.
We’re from old ACHS, from the school we all love so.
We’re backing you to win for her, let's go team let's go.

Today, "ACHS" is commonly replaced with "AHS".

Athletics

List of IHSA (Illinois High School Association) Teams 
 Baseball
 Basketball (Boys & Girls)
 Bass fishing
 Cheerleading
 Cross country (Boys & Girls)
 Football
 Golf
 Scholastic Bowl
 Soccer (Boys & Girls)
 Softball
 Swimming (sport)
 Track and field (Boys & Girls)
 Volleyball

Boys basketball 
In December 2012, the team placed 1st at the Waverly Holiday Tournament.  Team members Ryan McHenry and Nate Todd were part of the 2nd All-Tournament Team.

State Final Qualifier (4): 1924, 1926, 1927, 1937
District (7): 1922, 1924, 1925, 1926, 1927, 1929, 1930
Regional (10): 1936, 1937, 1938, 1940, 1948, 1949, 1950, 1972A, 1989A, 1994A
Sectional (5): 1924, 1926, 1927, 1937, 1941
4th (1): 1926
2nd (1): 1924

Bass fishing 
Team Qualifier (4): 2009, 2010, 2010, 2011.
Sectional (3): 2009, 2010, 2011.

Boys cross country 
Team Qualifier (6): 1982A, 1983A, 1984A, 1985A, 2001A, 2002A.
Regional (7): 1982A, 1983A, 1985A, 1999A, 2000A, 2001A, 2002A.
Sectional (1): 2001A.

Girls cross country 
Team Qualifier (2): 2002A, 2003A.
Regional (3): 1984, 2000A, 2002A

Football 
Playoff Qualifier (6): 2008-2A, 2010-2A, 2011-2A 2012-2a 2013-2a 2014-2a Quarter finals 2015-2a Quarter finals

Scholastic Bowl 
In 2013, the Athens Scholastic Bowl team hosted and won their regional. In 2012, the team placed 4th at the Regional Masonic Tournament. They then went on to win their sectional.

Men's Track & Field 
Track standout Ben Montgomery went to state in the Triple Jump placing 2nd with a jump of 45 feet 9.5 inches. He also went to state in the 400 Meter Dash and placed 5th. School records for the 4x400 Meter Relay, Triple Jump, 400 Meter Dash, and 4x200 are all held by Ben Montgomery. Multiple meet records were also set for the triple jump by Ben. (Graduated 2014)
Jake Montgomery, brother of recently mentioned Ben Montgomery, holds the 300M Hurdle school record as well as the 110M Hurdle record. He also made finals his junior year for the 300M Hurdles.(Graduated 2014)
With an average team size of around 10 athletes, it is very uncommon to see such great talent within this squad. The Montgomery twins will go down in history as the greatest track running duo Athens has ever known.
In 2008, Athens did have other great talent in the form of Ben and Brian Bishop who were a throwing duo. They are known as the greatest throwers that Athens has ever known.

Girls volleyball 
State Final Qualifier (2): 1976, 1979A, 2019
District (5): 1976, 1977A, 1978A, 1979A, 1980A
Regional (1): 1982A
Sectional (4): 1976, 1977A, 1978A, 1979A
Super-Sectional (2): 1976, 1979A
4th (1): 1976

Clubs

List of active clubs
 Archery
 Biology Club
 Class Officer
 Drama Club
 FFA (Chapter of National FFA Organization)
 FCCLA (Family, Career and Community Leaders of America)
 Journalism Contests
 Leadership Committee
 Math Team
 National Honors Society (abbreviated "NHS")
 Poms Squad
 Show Choir
 Student Council
 Teens Making A Difference (abbreviated "TMD")
 WYSE (formally named Worldwide Youth in Science and Engineering) Team
 Yearbook

References 

Education in Menard County, Illinois
Public high schools in Illinois